Wensleydale is a style of cheese originally produced in Wensleydale, North Yorkshire, England, but now mostly made in large commercial creameries throughout the United Kingdom.  The term "Yorkshire Wensleydale" can only be used for cheese that is made in Wensleydale. The style of cheese originated from a monastery of French Cistercian monks who had settled in northern England, and continued to be produced by local farmers after the monastery was dissolved in 1540. Wensleydale cheese fell to low production in the early 1990s, but its popularity was revitalized by frequent references in the Wallace and Gromit series.

Flavour and texture
Wensleydale is a medium cheese that is supple and crumbly. It has a slight honey aroma.

Common flavour combinations
The flavour of Wensleydale is suited to combination with sweeter produce, such as fruit like sweet apples. Many restaurants and delicatessens serve cranberry Wensleydale, which contains cranberries in the cheese.

In Yorkshire and North East England it is often eaten with fruit cake or Christmas cake.

History

Wensleydale cheese was first made by French Cistercian monks from the Roquefort region, who had settled in Wensleydale. They built a monastery at Fors, but some years later the monks moved to Jervaulx in Lower Wensleydale. They brought with them a recipe for making cheese from sheep's milk. During the 14th century cows' milk began to be used instead, and the character of the cheese began to change. A little ewes' milk was still mixed in since it gave a more open texture, and allowed the development of the blue mould. At that time, Wensleydale was almost always blue with the white variety almost unknown. Nowadays, the opposite is true, with blue Wensleydale rarely seen. When the monastery was dissolved in 1540, the local farmers continued making the cheese until the Second World War, during which most milk in the country was used for the making of "Government Cheddar". Even after rationing ceased in 1954, cheese making did not return to pre-war levels.

The first creamery to produce Wensleydale commercially was established in 1897 in the town of Hawes. Wensleydale Dairy Products, who bought the Wensleydale Creamery in 1992, sought to protect the name Yorkshire Wensleydale under an EU regulation; Protected Geographical Indication status was awarded in 2013.

References in culture

In the 1990s, sales of Wensleydale cheese from the Wensleydale Creamery had fallen so low that production in Wensleydale itself was at risk of being suspended. The cheese experienced a boost in its popularity after being featured in the Wallace and Gromit clay-animated shorts A Grand Day Out, The Wrong Trousers, and A Close Shave, because of which the company survived. The main character of the series, Wallace, a cheese connoisseur, and inventor, mentions Wensleydale as a particularly favourite cheese. Animator and creator Nick Park chose it solely because it had a good name that would be interesting to animate the lip sync to rather than due to its origins in northern England where the shorts were set. He was also unaware of the financial difficulties that the company was experiencing. The company contacted Aardman Animations about a licence for a special brand of Wensleydale cheese called, "Wallace and Gromit Wensleydale", which sold well. When the 2005 full-length Wallace and Gromit film, The Curse of the Were-Rabbit, was released, sales of Wensleydale cheeses increased by 23%.

Wensleydale is one of the cheeses mentioned in the Cheese shop sketch of Monty Python's Flying Circus that Mr. Mousebender attempts to purchase, without success. There is a glimmer of hope the shop may have this variety of cheese, only for the proprietor to reveal that his name is Arthur Wensleydale, and he thought he was being personally addressed.

See also

 List of cheeses
 List of British cheeses

References

External links

 Wensleydale Creamery

English cheeses
Yorkshire cuisine
Cow's-milk cheeses
Sheep's-milk cheeses
Blue cheeses
Wensleydale
Mixed-milk cheeses
British products with protected designation of origin
Cheeses with designation of origin protected in the European Union